Otto Bache (21 August 1839 – 28 June 1927) was a Danish Realist painter. Many of his works depict key events in Danish history.

Biography
At age eleven he received a dispensation and was admitted into the Royal Danish Academy of Fine Arts, studying under Wilhelm Marstrand, among others.

In 1866, he received the Academy's travel grant and went to Paris and later to Italy. His stay in Paris had a particularly deep impact on his work, turning it in a direction characterized by more freedom, more colour, stronger light, and broader scope. Upon his return in 1868, he was married.

He was named a Commander in the Order of the Dannebrog and later was awarded the Dannebrogordenens Hæderstegn.

He received early recognition as a portrait painter but he also showed great interest in painting animal motifs, gradually also turning to genre works and history painting.

Gallery

References

External links

1839 births
1927 deaths
19th-century Danish painters
20th-century Danish painters
Danish history painters
Danish portrait painters
Danish male painters
19th-century painters of historical subjects
Directors of the Royal Danish Academy of Fine Arts
Recipients of the Thorvaldsen Medal
Royal Danish Academy of Fine Arts alumni
Commanders of the Order of the Dannebrog
Burials at Holmen Cemetery
19th-century Danish male artists
20th-century Danish male artists